A list of films produced in Italy in 1926 (see 1926 in film):

See also
List of Italian films of 1925
List of Italian films of 1927

External links
 Italian films of 1926 at the Internet Movie Database

Italian
1926
Films